Alexander Matveevich Poniatoff (tr. Aleksándr Matvéjevič Ponjatóv; 25 March 1892 – 24 October 1980) was a Russian-born American electrical engineer.

Poniatoff was born in 1892 in Russkaya Aysha, Kazansky District, Kazan Governorate, Russian Empire. He emigrated from Russia to China, where he worked for the Shanghai Power Company, until he emigrated to the United States in 1927. He would subsequently work for General Electric, Pacific Gas & Electric and Dalmo-Victor. In 1944 he founded Ampex, using his initials A.M.P. plus "ex" for "excellence" to create the name. The high-frequency bias technique, which made quality recording possible, was invented by Telefunken engineers and put into practical use by Poniatoff. Danish engineer Valdemar Poulsen's original magnetic recorder was previously only usable for telephony recording. In 1956, Ampex engineers created the world's first rotary head recorder, the VR-1000 videotape recorder. Poniatoff served as president of Ampex until 1955, when he was elected chairman of the board. He died in 1980.

References

External links

About Poniatoff at the 20th Century American Leaders Database
Нехамкин Э. АЛЕКСАНДР ПОНЯТОВ 

1892 births
1980 deaths
20th-century American engineers
American people of Russian descent
Emigrants from the Russian Empire to China
Emigrants from the Russian Empire to the United States
Russian engineers
Russian inventors
20th-century American inventors